Barysaŭski trakt, (also referred to as Barysawski trakt or Borisovskiy trakt) is a Minsk Metro station on the Maskoŭskaja line. Opened on November 7, 2007 the station's name is derived from the Barysaŭ Highway which leads to a city that is northeast of Minsk.

The station will be a standard single level pillar-bispan with hi-tech aesthetic design of white and red colours. Station exits will lead to the Belarusian National Technical University and East (Maskoŭskija) cemetery.

Gallery

References

Minsk Metro stations
Railway stations opened in 2007